Give Us A Break is a 1978 comedy album by comedy duo Proctor and Bergman, one half of the Firesign Theatre.

Track listing

Side One

 "Hot Rock Radio – 0:30"
 "Carumba – 0:45" — Proctor parodies Ricardo Montalbán's Chrysler Cordoba commercials, where he extols the "rich Corinthian leather" interior
 "Brainduster Memory School – 1:30"
 "Whale Oil – 1:10"
 "U.N. In Session – 3:00"
 "Dr. X – 1:20"
 "Consumer Watchdog – 1:25"
 "Fab Fad Fashions – 1:30"
 "ZBS-TV – 2:15"
 "Ten-Shun – 1:40"
 "C.B. Course – 1:30"

Side Two
 "Lemon Car - 2:20"
 "Movie Spots - 1:20"
 "Chef Entree - 1:55"
 "Nukes In The News - 2:35"
 "Flu Song - 1:35"
 "Sweetened History - 1:15"
 "Sat Nite Gun Mart - 0:40"
 "Sneezers Chicken - 1:20"
 "What Did That Man Say? - 1:45"
 "Hot Rock Radio - 0:10"
 "Our Natural Anthem - 0:25"

Cover art
The album cover shows a photographed clay sculpture by Robert Grossman, who painted the cover for the 1970 Firesign Theatre album Don't Crush That Dwarf, Hand Me the Pliers.

References

1978 albums
Proctor and Bergman albums
Mercury Records albums
1970s comedy albums